Einstein's Bridge is a hard science fiction novel by physicist and science fiction writer John G. Cramer.

Publication history
The novel was first published in June 1997 in hardcover and trade paperback formats by Avon Books. The company followed up by publishing a mass-market paperback version in 1998. The novel is currently out of print.

Plot
The plot revolves around three central human characters, George Griffin, Roger Coulton, and Alice Lang. Set from 1987 to 2004, the book details the efforts of physicists George and Roger as they work to bring the Superconducting Super Collider (SSC) online in Waxahachie, Texas. Alice is a novelist, working on her latest horror work, who becomes involved as she researches material for her book at the SSC. She and George fall in love just as preliminary trial runs of the SSC produce an unexplained phenomenon: a Snark, to borrow an expression from Lewis Carroll, or an impossible event, in the form of a heavy particle which emerged from the planned head-on collision between two 20 TeV protons inside the SSC.

In addition to violating physical laws such as the conservation of mass, this particle emits pulses of radioactivity, spelling out the numerical prime number sequence of 2-3-5-7-11-13-17-19-23-29-31-37. Therein begins the unraveling of an even greater mystery than the particle itself: a powerful intelligence is behind this event, seeking to communicate with Humankind, which has unwittingly announced itself to the universe through the powerful bursts of energy unleashed with the collisions of particles within the SSC. For a time, this first contact is made by a benevolent species. Another species is also working to make contact—a less benevolent species, whose intent may ultimately destroy the Earth and perhaps even the fabric of the universe.

The plot does not take place in our timeline but in an alternative history—one in which the Superconducting Super Collider was built in Texas. In reality, the project was cancelled in 1993 and never implemented. In this alternate history, American forces invaded Baghdad and overthrew Saddam Hussein after liberating Kuwait during the Gulf War (1990-1991), leading to George H. W. Bush's re-election in 1992 over Bill Clinton. The sinister significance of all this, and the relation of this alternative history to ours, become clear in the last part of the book.

Critical reception
In reviewing the novel, SF Site said "Cramer weaves a compelling tale." Kirkus Reviews noted "Cramer splendidly demonstrates just how fascinating and mind- boggling real science can be, and shows exactly how vulnerable basic research is to political whim."

References

External links 

1997 novels
1997 science fiction novels
Fiction about wormholes
Novels set in Texas
Hard science fiction
Waxahachie, Texas
American alternate history novels